The Sultan Qaboos Grand Mosque is a mosque located in Sohar, Oman. It was named after the previous Sultan of Oman, Qaboos bin Said.

Construction
The mosque is built on a site occupying 181,000 sq. metres and the built up area is 28,778 sq. metres. The area allocated for the mosque accommodates landscaping, car parks and other facilities.  The main prayer hall can hold over 4600 worshipers, while the women's area can accommodate 740 worshipers.

The mosque has a garden, three main entrances, four minarets, and a blue main dome. It also integrates wood in its design. The interior of the mosque is intricate with subtle colors. The Mihrab is beautifully tiled in a turquoise and gold palette. The carpet has a horizontally-lined pattern.

Gallery

See also

 List of mosques in Oman

References

Mosques in Oman
Buildings and structures in Muscat, Oman
Mosque buildings with domes
Culture in Muscat, Oman
Tourist attractions in Muscat, Oman
Ibadi mosques
Sultan Qaboos
Tourist attractions in Oman